The Silverdale Formation is a Miocene formation of biomicrudite (fine fragments of mollusk shells) in North Carolina, United States.

See also

 List of fossiliferous stratigraphic units in North Carolina

References

Paleogene geology of North Carolina
Silurian northern paleotropical deposits